Hierodoris s-fractum is a moth of the family Oecophoridae. It is endemic to New Zealand and can be found only in the southern parts of the South Island. The male is larger than the female. This species is very similar in appearance to H. eletrica however H. s-fractum has an interrupted silver S-mark on the forewing and longer labial palps. The larvae has not yet been described. Hoare hypothesised that the larvae of this species likely feeds on leaf-litter. The species seems to prefer open dry areas and can be found in native shrub and gorse.

Taxonomy 
This species was described by Robert Hoare in 2005. The male holotype specimen, collected in West Melton, is held at the New Zealand Arthropod Collection.

Description 

The wingspan of the male is between 14.5 to 17 mm while the female has a smaller wingspan of between 12 to 14 mm. The female shows slightly brachypterous wings and may not fly often. This species is very similar in appearance to H. eletrica however H. s-fractum has an interrupted silver S-mark on the forewing and longer labial palps. The larvae has not yet been described.

Distribution
This species is endemic to New Zealand and can be found only in the southern parts of the South Island.

Habitat and host species 
Hoare hypothesised that the larvae of this species likely feeds on leaf-litter. The species seems to prefer open dry areas and can be found in native shrub and gorse.

References 

Moths described in 2005
Moths of New Zealand
Oecophoridae
Endemic fauna of New Zealand
Taxa named by Robert Hoare
Endemic moths of New Zealand